The Gruwell and Crew General Store is one of the oldest buildings in West Branch, Iowa. Mayor S.C. Gruwell and J.C. Crew built the structure in 1894, it operated as a music store, harness shop, shoe repair shop, and as a variety store. In 1964 the West Branch Heritage Foundation converted it to a museum. The building has its original false-front facade and wooden ceiling, floor and walls. It is part of the West Branch Commercial Historic District.

Preservation Iowa has listed the Gruwell and Crew General Store on its most endangered list, citing its deteriorating condition and lack of support.

References

Buildings and structures in Cedar County, Iowa
National Register of Historic Places in Cedar County, Iowa
Commercial buildings on the National Register of Historic Places in Iowa
Commercial buildings completed in 1894
Retail buildings in Iowa
Individually listed contributing properties to historic districts on the National Register in Iowa